Georgios Ioannidis (born 17 April 1966) is a Greek boxer. He competed in the men's middleweight event at the 1988 Summer Olympics.

References

External links
 

1966 births
Living people
Greek male boxers
Olympic boxers of Greece
Boxers at the 1988 Summer Olympics
Place of birth missing (living people)
Middleweight boxers
20th-century Greek people